Arthur Galan AG is an Australian fashion brand based in Melbourne with menswear and womenswear lines. It is more popular for its menswear and is regularly featured in Australian men's fashion magazine, GQ Australia.

History
Arthur Galan AG is famous for its paisley shirts. The menswear line was launched in 1998. Its womenswear line was launched in March 2006. This brand is designed by Arthur Galan. Arthur Galan AG has five menswear stores in Melbourne and Sydney. There are also two womenswear stores in Melbourne and one in Sydney.

Arthur Galan AG menswear and womenswear was originally sold at David Jones department stores in Australia but switched to rival Myer, following an agreement announced in January 2011. AG is also available internationally, with stockists in New Zealand, Hong Kong (Lane Crawford and Harvey Nichols) and Singapore (Tangs).

References

External links
Official Website
Football Jerseys
Elmont Youth Soccer

Clothing brands
Clothing brands of Australia
Clothing companies established in 1998
Retail companies established in 1998